Dr. June Schlueter is Charles A. Dana Professor Emerita of English at Lafayette College in Easton, Pennsylvania.  Her areas of specialty are Shakespeare, Early Modern England, and Modern Drama.  She is married to Dr. Paul Schlueter, who is a specialist in English literature. Dr. Schlueter has taught at Lafayette College since 1977 where she has taught: Modern Drama (American, British, Comparative); Shakespeare; The London Theatre (in London); Drama Survey (Greeks through Shakespeare, Restoration through Modern); Tudor and Stuart Drama; introductory writing and literature courses; British literature survey; Major American Writers; introductory writing and literature courses; interdisciplinary courses on the McCarthy era and on literature, science, and technology; advised student dramatic productions.  From 1993 until 2006 she was Provost of Lafayette College.  Dr. Schlueter has served on the Board of Trustees for Fairleigh Dickinson University.

Dr. Schlueter  has a B.A (1970). Fairleigh Dickinson University, Rutherford, NJ (English, magna cum laude),   an M.A. (1973) from Hunter College, New York, NY  in English and a Ph.D. from Columbia University in English and Comparative Literature.

Books written 
Metafictional Characters in Modern Drama. New York: Columbia UP, 1979.
Review, Theatre Journal, May, 1980, vol. 32, no. 2, p. 272-273
Review,  Modern Language Journal, Summer, 1980, vol. 64, no. 2, p. 279-280
The Plays and Novels of Peter Handke. Pittsburgh: U of Pittsburgh P, 1981.
Review, German Quarterly, May, 1983, vol. 56, no. 3, p. 526-527
Arthur Miller. New York: Ungar, 1987 (with James K. Flanagan—Flanagan wrote introductory biographical chapter).
Reading Shakespeare in Performance: King Lear. Madison: Fairleigh Dickinson UP, 1991 (with James P. Lusardi).
Review,  Shakespeare Quarterly, Autumn, 1993, vol. 44, no. 3, p. 367-369
Dramatic Closure: Reading the End. Madison: Fairleigh Dickinson UP, 1995.
Review, The Modern Language Review, Jan., 1998, vol. 93, no. 1, p. 163
The Album Amicorum and the London of Shakespeare’s Time. London: The British Library, 2011.

Books edited 

The English Novel: Twentieth Century Criticism, Vol. 2: Twentieth Century Novelists. Athens: Ohio UP, 1982 (with Paul Schlueter).
Modern American Literature, Supplement II. New York: Ungar, 1985 (with Paul Schlueter).
An Encyclopedia of British Women Writers. New York: Garland Publishing, 1988 (with Paul Schlueter). Reprinted in substantial part in Wilson, Katharina M. and Paul and June Schlueter, ed. Women Writers of Great Britain and Europe: An Encyclopedia (New York: Garland Publishing, 1997). Second, revised and expanded ed. (New Brunswick: Rutgers UP, 1999) (with Paul Schlueter).
Feminist Rereadings of Modern American Drama. Madison: Fairleigh Dickinson UP, 1989.
Modern American Drama: The Female Canon. Madison: Fairleigh Dickinson UP, 1990.
Approaches to Teaching Beckett’s Waiting for Godot. New York: Modern Language Ass’n., 1991 (with Enoch Brater).
Critical Essays: The Two Gentlemen of Verona. New York: Garland Publishing, 1996.
Francis A. March: Selected Writings of the First Professor of English. Easton, PA: Lafayette College, 2005 (with Paul Schlueter).
Acts of Criticism: Performance Matters in Shakespeare and His Contemporaries. Madison: Fairleigh Dickinson UP, 2006 (with Paul Nelsen).

Chapters in reference books

“Brian Friel.” Dictionary of Literary Biography: British Dramatists Since World War II. Detroit: Gale Research, 1982.
"August Strindberg.” Critical Survey of Drama. LaCanada, CA: Salem P, 1986.
Modern Drama section of Books for College Libraries. Middletown, CT: Books for College Libraries, 1988.
“David Mamet.” and “Arthur Miller.” Contemporary American Dramatists, Bibliography Series. Ed. Matthew J. Roudané. Detroit: Gale Research, 1989.
“T. S. Eliot.”,and  “Eugene O’Neill.”,  The Biographical Dictionary of the Nobel Prize Laureates in Literature. Ed. Rado Pribic. New York: Garland Publishing, 1990.
“Peter Handke.” Exile and Displacement: An Encyclopedia of a Twentieth Century Literary Phenomenon. Ed. Martin Tucker. Westport: Greenwood P, 1991.
“Arthur Asher Miller.” The Scribner Encyclopedia of American Lives: The 1960s, vol. 2. Ed. William L. O’Neill. New York: Charles Scribner's Sons, 2003. 75–77.

Editorships
Editor, Shakespeare Bulletin, 1984‑2003; associate editor, 1982-84 (with James P. Lusardi).
Editor, Pennsylvania English, journal of The Pennsylvania College English Association, 1981‑86 (with Paul Schlueter).

References

External links 
 Official CV at Lafayette College
 Profile as Fairleigh Dickinson University’s Board of Trustees
 Bookfinder listing of publications by Dr. Schlueter
 June and Paul Schlueter discover unknown poems by Mary Sidney Herbert Countess of Pembroke
 June Schlueter talks about 'Shakespeare and The Book of Friends' Jan 27, 2012 Lehigh Valley The Morning Call Newspaper.

Living people
Year of birth missing (living people)